"LazyBaby" was a song recorded by American singer and songwriter Dove Cameron, released by Disruptor and Columbia Records on April 2, 2021. Cameron based the song around the breakdown of a romantic relationship, but labeled it a "breakthrough song" rather than a breakup song.

In March 2022, all of Dove Cameron's music that was released before her breakthrough single "Boyfriend" was removed from music platforms including "LazyBaby".

Release and composition
Speaking on co-writing the song with Jonas Jeberg, Marcus Lomax and Melanie Joy Fontana, she liked that the song could incorporate numerous experiences. She felt that it makes "LazyBaby" relatable since it is a mixture of people's feelings, which came together to form a "common narrative". Cameron stated that "LazyBaby" is based on her breakup with ex-boyfriend Thomas Doherty, since she "knew that [she] had to write a song about it" and acknowledge it, since she always addresses her personal experiences through music. Cameron opined that "LazyBaby" is not a breakup song, but is instead a "breakthrough song". She explained that it is not a hateful or malicious song, and that there is "a wink inside every lyric". Talking about the lyrical content, Cameron said that it is about still loving somebody, but choosing to end the relationship to "put yourself first" and "give yourself all the love you had been giving to them". Cameron noted that writing a song like "LazyBaby" was important for her mental health. She explained that she needed a song to help her not "collapse into a pile of nothing". Cameron described "LazyBaby" as a funny song, since it reframes heartbreak into a way that helps people cope with it. She released it with the intention of bringing "joy" and music that "feels euphoric". The song is a mixture between the disco and pop genres, and has been compared to the work of Dua Lipa.

Cameron hinted the release of the song with various social media posts prior to its release. On February 25, 2021, Cameron hosted an Instagram livestream, where she played a snippet of the song to viewers. The song was described by Glamour as "a fun anthem about bouncing back after heartbreak". The release of "LazyBaby" was described by Gay Times as Cameron's "big return" to music, as it acts as the lead single from her upcoming project. Cameron felt that with the release of "LazyBaby", it was marking a point in her musical career where she was releasing "strong, anthemic, freeing" music, while also drawing on personal experiences and her past. She explained that due to tragedies in her early life, she does not like sad songs. Therefore, she did not want to release a sad song since she felt that she experienced enough "darkness". The song was released on April 2, 2021, with an accompanying music video directed by Jasper Soloff.

Credits and personnel
Credits adapted from Spotify.

 Dove Cameron – vocals, songwriting
 Jonas Jeberg – songwriting, production
 Marcus Lomax – songwriting
 Melanie Joy Fontana – songwriting

Charts

Release history

References

2021 singles
2021 songs
Columbia Records singles
Disruptor Records singles
Dove Cameron songs
Songs written by Dove Cameron
Songs written by Jonas Jeberg
Songs written by Melanie Fontana